GBC Asset Management is a division of Pembroke Management Ltd., a privately held Canadian investment management firm that manages investment portfolios and separately managed accounts for Canadian pension funds, foundations, endowments, wealthy families and individuals, in addition to the GBC family of mutual funds. Since Pembroke's founding in 1968, the portfolio management team has applied fundamental analysis and conducted ongoing executive level interviews in order to identify high quality companies with compelling growth prospects, unrecognized intrinsic value and strong entrepreneurial leadership.

The Great Britain and Canada Investment Corporation, now known as the GBC American Growth Fund Inc., was incorporated in 1929 and has been managed by Pembroke Management since 1968. In order to expand and diversify the investment strategies offered by the firm under the GBC banner, Pembroke founded GBC Asset Management. GBC Asset Management is a subsidiary of Pembroke Management and is a mutual fund manager and dealer for the GBC family of mutual funds and Pembroke family of pooled funds.

History
1929 Great Britain and Canada Investment Corporation was incorporated in March and $11,000,000 was raised through the efforts of Nesbitt Thomson, Govett Sons & Co. and Iselin & Co.
1968 Pembroke Management Ltd. was founded in September by Neil B. Ivory, Clifford L. Larock, A. Scott Taylor and Ian A. Soutar to manage GBC Capital, which had previously been managed by Arbuckle Govett. The firm's name is a reference to Pembroke College, Cambridge.
1970 The Pembroke Fund Ltd. was launched.
1988 GBC Asset Management Inc. was founded by Ivory & Sime PLC, Pembroke Management Ltd. and Bob Stewart to market the GBC family of mutual funds in Canada and the United Kingdom. In June 2007, GBC Asset Management appointed Elizabeth B. Dawson as the President and Director.

References

External links
Rob Carrick "A mutual fund family worth knowing about", The Globe and Mail, September 28, 2010
Simon Avery "Fixated on the Fed" The Globe and Mail October 10, 2010
Shirley Won "Betting on a North American Recovery" The Globe and Mail December 8, 2010
Linkedin
Facebook
Company website

Financial services companies established in 1929
Investment management companies of Canada
1929 establishments in Ontario
Canadian companies established in 1929